According to the Iran Petroleum Ministry, the proved natural gas reserves of Iran are about  or about 17.8% of world's total reserves, of which 33% are as associated gas and 67% is in non associated gas fields. It has the world's second largest reserves after Russia.

The US Energy Information Administration estimated Iran's proved gas reserves as of 2016 to be  , rendering it second in the world.

Iran is one of the most hydrocarbon-rich areas in the world. Since the nation's first oil well in 1908, 145 hydrocarbon fields and 297 oil and gas reservoirs have been discovered in Iran, with many fields having multiple pay zones. A total of 102 fields are oil and the remaining 43 are gas, and there are 205 oil reservoirs and 92 natural gas reservoirs. According to Iran Energy Balance Sheet (2009, in Persian), 78 of these fields are currently active, with 62 onshore and 16 offshore, leaving 67 fields inactive at present. Some 23 hydrocarbon fields lie in border areas and are shared between Iran and adjacent countries, including Kuwait, Iraq, Qatar, Bahrain, UAE, Saudi Arabia and Turkmenistan.

The Permo-Triassic successions (the Dehram group in Iran and its lateral equivalent, the Khuff formation), are major gas-producing intervals in these basins. The supergiant North Dome/South Pars field alone is estimated to hold about 19% of the world's total gas reserves, producing gas and condensate from these intervals.

Iran still has huge potential for new significant gas discoveries: areas such as Caspian Sea, North East, Central Kavir and especially areas starting from Aghar and Dalan gas fields in Fars province up to the Strait of Hormuz and Central Persian Gulf have considerable potential for undiscovered gas. According to Exploration Directorate of NIOC, there are about 150 unexplored anticlines in Iran.

In 1998, the US Geological Survey estimated Iran's undiscovered gas resources to be in the range of 226 to 820 trillion cubic feet, with a probability-weighted average of 

In January 2008, Iranian Minister of Petroleum Gholam-Hossein Nozari said, "NIOC has a target of producing one billion cubic meters of gas per day.

Iran's ten biggest non-associated gas fields:

There are also several discovered gas fields in Iran which hold low portion of CH4 and high portion of N2. These gas fields are Kabir Kuh, Milatun, Samand, Holeylan and Ahmadi. The Kabir Kuh gas field located in Lurestan province has  of gas in place. The field gas consists of N2 64.33%, CH4 33.64%, CO2 2% and He 0.03%.

Iran also owns 50% of the offshore gas field of Rhum in the North Sea, which is Britain's largest untapped gas field.

Development

This means that Iran is one of the few countries capable of supplying much larger amounts of natural gas in the future. Iran's overall gas exports in 2009/10 reached a record high of 6.8 billion cubic meters, increasing 44% over the previous year.

Iran's net export of gas in 2010 was 1.57 billion cubic metres. In 2010, Iran's exports and imports of natural gas were 8.42 and 6.85 billion cubic metres respectively. In 2010, Iran exported 0.4, 0.25, and 7.77 billion cubic metres of gas to Armenia, Azerbaijan and Turkey respectively. In terms of imports, Iran has received 0.35 and 6.5 billion cubic metres from Azerbaijan and Turkmenistan respectively. Iran has approximately 29.6 trillion cubic meters of proven gas reserves which accounts for 16% of the world's total reserves. This places Iran behind Russia with the second largest gas reserves worldwide. In 2009, Iran's natural gas production stood at 116 billion cubic metres. In 2010, this number rose to 138.5 billion cubic metres which shows a 19% increase. Most of Iran's gas is consumed domestically and has been increasing at an average annual rate of 12% for the past 15 years.

It will invest $50 billion from 2010 until 2020 on LNG projects. Iran plans to export 8 million tons of LNG by 2012. The country also aims to increase natural gas exports by fivefold to  a year by 2014. Global gas demand is projected to rise between 2 percent and 3 percent a year for the next 20 to 25 years, with India and China the main markets for Iran's gas exports.

A December 2011 report from Iran's Petroleum Minister indicated that a large natural gas reserve was discovered inside Iran's side of the Caspian Sea. These reserves are estimated at 50 trillion cubic feet (1.42 trillion cubic meter).

See also

International rankings of Iran in Energy
World's Largest Gas Fields
Rhum gasfield
Ferdowsi Gas Field

References

External links
Methodology in estimating the size of oil and gas fields
Iran Oil & Gas Directory - oilgas.ir